Vyacheslav Aleksandrovich Krotov (born 14 February 1993) is a Russian professional football player who plays as a striker for FC Pari Nizhny Novgorod.

Club career
He made his debut in the Russian Premier League for FC Spartak Moscow in a game against FC Krylia Sovetov Samara on 10 May 2013.

On 17 June 2022, Krotov signed a two-year contract with FC Pari Nizhny Novgorod.

Career statistics

External links

References

1993 births
Sportspeople from Astrakhan
Living people
Russian footballers
Association football forwards
FC Volgar Astrakhan players
FC Spartak Moscow players
FC Spartak-2 Moscow players
FC Ufa players
FC Nizhny Novgorod (2015) players
Russian Premier League players
Russian First League players
Russian Second League players